Bellville is an unincorporated community in Marion County, in the U.S. state of Missouri.

The community was named after D.W. Bell, a local merchant.

References

Unincorporated communities in Marion County, Missouri
Unincorporated communities in Missouri